Michu (real name Miguel Pérez Cuesta; born 1986) is a Spanish former footballer.

Michu  may also refer to:

Clément Michu (1936–2016), French actor
Michu Meszaros (1939–2016), Hungarian-born actor    
Michu of Silla, the thirteenth ruler of the Korean state of Silla